Ace of Space 2 is the second season of Indian reality competition television series, MTV Ace of Space. Hosted by Vikas Gupta, it aired from 24 August 2019 to 3 November 2019 on MTV India. After 72 days, Salman Zaidi was declared the winner.

Concept
Eighteen contestants were divided into two teams: The Kings and The Jacks. They had to perform tasks, showcase their personalities and manage survival for 72 days amidst reducing space and increasing conflicts.

Contestants
 

 Male
 Female

Living Status

Notes
 Evicted
 Walked

Trump & Dagger Card

Notes
 Trump Card Winner
 Dagger Card Receiver

Voting History

Notes
 Immune
 Pre–Nominated
 Fewest Votes
 Against Public Vote
 Evicted
 Left

Guests

References

External links
 Official Website

2019 Indian television seasons
MTV (Indian TV channel) original programming
Indian reality television series
Hindi-language television shows